Kai Karsten (born 22 June 1968) is a retired German sprinter who specialized in the 400 metres.

Karsten competed for the club Eintracht Braunschweig, which in athletics enters a joint team with other Braunschweig-based clubs under the name of LG Braunschweig. In 1994, he won the national championship in the 400 metres.

Karsten represented Germany in the 4 × 400 metres relay events at the 1994 European Athletics Championships in Helsinki, the 1995 World Championships in Athletics in Gothenburg, and the 1996 Summer Olympics in Atlanta.

References

External links
 

1968 births
Living people
Sportspeople from Braunschweig
LG Braunschweig athletes
German male sprinters
Athletes (track and field) at the 1996 Summer Olympics
Olympic athletes of Germany
German national athletics champions
World Athletics Championships athletes for Germany